William Grigs Atkinson (8 December 1888 – 15 March 1964), known professionally as Paul Cavanagh, was an English film and stage actor. He appeared in more than 100 films between 1928 and 1959.

Life and career
Cavanagh was born in Felling, Durham. He attended the Royal Grammar School, Newcastle upon Tyne, and Emmanuel College, Cambridge, where he was an undergraduate student. Cavanagh studied law in England, earning a master of arts degree at Cambridge. A newspaper article published 17 June 1931, reported, "It is on record that Cavanagh won high honors in mathematics and history."

Cavanagh practised "for several years" before he changed professions. He went to Canada "for a year of sightseeing and wandering" before he joined and served nine months with the Royal North-West Mounted Police.

After serving in World War I, he returned to Canada, where he practised law, including revising the statutes of Alberta, but eventually went back to England to practise law. Cavanagh went onto the stage after a stroke of bad luck in 1924 caused him to lose his savings, and later he went into films.

In 1926, Cavanagh lost $22,000 in one evening on a roulette wheel in Monte Carlo. An observer offered to provide a letter "to some of my theatrical acquaintances" in London, England. Those contacts led to Cavanagh's role in Walter Hackett's It Pays to Advertise. He also appeared in Eden Phillpotts' Blue Comet in the West End.

After appearing in a handful of British silent films he moved to the United States. Cavanagh's first film contract and film came in 1929 with Paramount Pictures.

Cavanagh died in London from a heart attack in 1964, aged 75.

Filmography

 Two Little Drummer Boys (1928) as Capt. Darrell
 Tesha (1928) as Lenane
 The Runaway Princess (1929) as Prince of Savonia
 Strictly Unconventional (1930) as Ted
 Grumpy (1930)  as Chamberlin Jarvis
 The Storm (1930) as Dave Stewart
 The Virtuous Sin (1930) as Capt. Orloff
 The Devil to Pay! (1930) as Grand Duke Paul
 Unfaithful (1931) as Ronald Killkerry
 Born to Love (1931) as Sir Wilfred Drake
 Always Goodbye (1931) as Reginald Armstrong, alias of Morgan
 Transgression (1931) as Robert Maury
 The Squaw Man (1931) as Henry - Earl of Kerhill
 Heartbreak (1931) as Captain Wolke
 Devil's Lottery (1932) as Major Hugo Beresford
 A Bill of Divorcement (1932) as Gray
 The Crash (1932) as Ronnie Sanderson
 Tonight Is Ours (1933) as Prince Keri of Zalgar
 Curtain at Eight (1933) as Wylie Thornton - Actor
 The Kennel Murder Case (1933) as Sir Thomas MacDonald
 The Sin of Nora Moran (1933) as Gov. Dick Crawford
 Uncertain Lady (1934) as Bruce King
 Tarzan and His Mate (1934) as Martin Arlington
 Shoot the Works (1934) as Alvin Ritchie
 The Notorious Sophie Lang (1934) as Max Bernard/Sir Nigel Crane
 One Exciting Adventure (1934) as Lavassor
 Menace (1934) as Col. Leonard Crecy
 Goin' to Town (1935) as Edward Carrington
 Escapade (1935)
 Without Regret (1935) as Robert Godfrey
 Thunder in the Night (1935) as Count Peter Alvinczy
 Splendor (1935) as Martin Deering
 Champagne Charlie (1936) as Charlie Cortland
 Crime Over London (1936) as Inspector Gary
 Cafe Colette (1937) as Ryan
 A Romance in Flanders (1937) as John Morley
 Within the Law (1939) as English Eddie
 The Under-Pup (1939) as Mr. Franklin Cooper
 Reno (1939) as John R. Banton
 I Take This Woman (1940) as Bill Rodgers
 The Case of the Black Parrot (1941) as Max Armand
 Maisie Was a Lady (1941) as 'Cap' Rawlston
 Shadows on the Stairs (1941) as Joseph Reynolds
 Passage from Hong Kong (1941) as Capt. Duncan MacNeil-Fraser
 Captains of the Clouds (1942) as Group Captain
 The Strange Case of Doctor Rx (1942) as John Crispin
 Pacific Rendezvous (1942) as Cmdr. Charles Brennan
 Eagle Squadron (1942) as Sir James Patridge
 The Hard Way (1943) as John 'Jack' Shagrue
 The Gorilla Man (1943) as Dr. Dorn
 Adventure in Iraq (1943) as Sheik Ahmid Bel Nor
 The Scarlet Claw (1944) as Lord Penrose
 Maisie Goes to Reno (1944) as Roger Pelham
 Marriage Is a Private Affair (1944) as Mr. Selworth
 This Man's Navy (1945) as Sir Anthony Tivall
 The Man in Half Moon Street (1945) as Dr. Henry Latimer
 The House of Fear (1945) as Simon Merrivale
 The Woman in Green (1945) as Fenwick
 Club Havana (1945) as Rogers
 Night in Paradise (1946) as Cleomenes
 Night and Day (1946) as Bart McClelland
 Wife Wanted (1946) as Jeffrey Caldwell
 The Verdict (1946) as Clive Russell
 Humoresque (1946) as Victor Wright
 Dishonored Lady (1947) as Victor Kranish
 Ivy (1947) as Dr. Berwick (uncredited)
 Secret Beyond the Door (1947) as Rick Barrett
 The Black Arrow (1948) as Sir John Sedley
 The Babe Ruth Story (1948) as Dr. Menzies
 You Gotta Stay Happy (1948) as Dr. Blucher
 Madame Bovary (1949) as Marquis D'Andervilliers
 The Iroquois Trail (1950) as Col. Eric Thorne
 Rogues of Sherwood Forest (1950) as Sir Giles
 Hi-Jacked (1950) as Hagen
 Hit Parade of 1951 (1950) as Two-to-One Thompson
 The Second Face (1950) as Todd Williams
 Tales of Robin Hood (1951) as Sir Gui de Clairmont
 Hollywood Story (1951) as Roland Paul
 The Highwayman (1951) (uncredited)
 The Desert Fox (1951) as Lt. Col. Caesar von Hofacker (uncredited)
 The Son of Dr. Jekyll (1951) as Insp. Stoddard
 Bride of the Gorilla (1951) as Klaas Van Gelder
 All That I Have (1951) as Dr. James Brady
 The Strange Door (1951) as Edmond de Maletroit
 Lady in the Iron Mask (1952) as Minor Role (uncredited)
 The Golden Hawk (1952) as Jeremy Smithers
 Plymouth Adventure (1952) as Governor John Carver (uncredited)
 The Mississippi Gambler (1953) as Edmond Dureau
 The Bandits of Corsica (1953) as Dianza
 House of Wax (1953) as Sidney Wallace
 Port Sinister (1953) as John Kolvac
 The Desert Rats (1953) as Colonel (uncredited)
 Flame of Calcutta (1953) as Lord Robert Clive
 All American (1953) as Professor Carl Banning
 Casanova's Big Night (1954) as Signor Alberto Di Gambetta
 The Iron Glove (1954) as Cavenly, advisor to Prince James
 Magnificent Obsession (1954) as Dr. Giraud
 The Law vs. Billy the Kid (1954) as John H. Tunstall
 The Raid (1954) as Col. Tucker
 Khyber Patrol (1954) as Brig. Gen. Melville
 Charade (1954) as Col. Heisler
 The Prodigal (1955) as Tobiah
 The Purple Mask (1955) as Duc de Latour
 The Scarlet Coat (1955) as Sir Henry Clinton
 The King's Thief (1955) as Sir Edward Scott
 Diane (1956) as Lord Bonnivet
 Women Without Men (1956) as Insp. D.N. Hedges (uncredited)
 Blonde Bait (1956) as Insp. D.N. Hedges
 Francis in the Haunted House (1956) as Neil Frazer
 The Man Who Turned to Stone (1957) as Cooper
 She Devil (1957) as Sugar Daddy
 God Is My Partner (1957) as Dr. James Brady
 In the Money (1958) as Inspector Herbert Saunders
 The Beat Generation (1959) as Will Belmont - Stan's Father (uncredited)
 The Four Skulls of Jonathan Drake (1959) as Kenneth Drake

Television

 Jungle Jim (1955–1956) as Commissioner Morrison in 8 episodes
 Lassie (1956) as Dr. Elwood Mason
 The Adventures of Jim Bowie (1956) as John Andrews
 Highway Patrol (American TV series)(1957) portrayed a vehicle thief
 Sergeant Preston of the Yukon (1957) as  Sir Philip Northrup
 Perry Mason (1957-1959) as Edgar Ferrell/ Horace Selkirk
 Adventures of Superman (1958) as Delbert Carter
 Tombstone Territory (1958) as Banker Racklin
 Northwest Passage (1958) as Colonel George Clayton
 Walt Disney Presents (1960) as Governor Rutledge (uncredited)
 Have Gun - Will Travel (1960) as Windrom

References

External links

1888 births
1964 deaths
20th-century English male actors
Male actors from London
British military personnel of World War I
English male film actors
English male television actors
People from Chislehurst
Male actors from Kent
People educated at the Royal Grammar School, Newcastle upon Tyne
Alumni of Emmanuel College, Cambridge
British expatriates in Canada
Royal Canadian Mounted Police officers